The Embassy of Moldova in Washington, D.C. is the diplomatic mission of the  Republic of Moldova to United States. It is located at 2101 S Street, Northwest, Washington, D.C. in the Kalorama neighborhood.

The embassy provides consular services to Moldova citizens residing or traveling in the US and Canada.

History
The United States of America recognized the independence of Moldova on December 25, 1991, and established diplomatic relations with the Republic of Moldova on February 28, 1992. 

The Republic of Moldova opened its embassy in Washington, D.C., in December 1993, after the United States of America opened the Embassy of the United States in Chişinău in March 1992.

The building

Before 1998, the embassy was located at 1511 K Street, Northwest. Since 1998, the Embassy of Moldova is a contributing property to the Sheridan-Kalorama Historic District. The Embassy of Moldova is located at 2101 S Street, NW in the Sheridan-Kalorama neighborhood of Washington, D.C. Its 2009 property value was $1,301,060. 

Constructed in 1898, the Beaux-Arts building originally served as the private residence of U.S. Agriculture Secretary James Wilson. In addition to Wilson, notable owners of the building have included the Ottoman Empire (offices of the Turkish Legation), Persian Empire (offices of the Persian Legation during the Qajar dynasty), Assistant Secretary of the Treasury James H. Moyle, Director of the U.S. Reclamation Service Frederick Haynes Newell, economist Alfred E. Kahn, the Scientific Time Sharing Corporation (headquarters), Governor of the U.S. Postal Service Timothy Lionel Jenkins, and American Visions magazine (headquarters).

Ambassadors
Ambassadors of Moldova in USA:
1993–1998: Nicolae Țâu
1999–2002: Ceslav Ciobanu
2002–2006: Mihail Manoli
2006–2009: Nicolae Chirtoacă
2010–2015: Igor Munteanu
2017: Aureliu Ciocoi
2018–2019: Cristina Balan
2020–2022: Eugen Caras
2022–present: Viorel Ursu

See also
 Moldova–United States relations
 Embassy of the United States in Chişinău
 United States Ambassador to Moldova
 List of diplomatic missions of Moldova
 Moldovan American

References

External links

 

Washington D.C.
Moldova
Moldova–United States relations
Sheridan-Kalorama Historic District
Historic district contributing properties in Washington, D.C.
Houses completed in 1898